The Australian Mathematics Competition is a mathematics competition run by the Australian Maths Trust for students from year 3 up to year 12 in Australia, and their equivalent grades in other countries. Since its inception in 1976 in the Australian Capital Territory, the participation numbers have increased to around 600,000, with around 100,000 being from outside Australia, making it the world's largest mathematics competition.

History 
The fore-runner of the competition, first held in 1976, was open to students within the Australian Capital Territory, and attracted 1200 entries. In 1976 and 1977 the outstanding entrants were awarded the Burroughs medal. In 1978, the competition became a nationwide event, and became known as the Australian Mathematics Competition for the Wales awards with 60,000 students from Australia and New Zealand participating. In 1983 the medals were renamed the Westpac awards following a change to the name of the title sponsor Westpac Banking Corporation (previously known as the Bank of New South Wales). Other sponsors since the inception of the competition have been the Canberra Mathematical Association and the University of Canberra (previously known as the Canberra College of Advanced Education).

The competition has since spread to countries such as New Zealand, Singapore, Fiji, Taiwan, China and Malaysia, which submit thousands of entries each. A French translation of the paper has been available since the current competition was established in 1978, with Chinese translation being made available to Hong Kong (Traditional Chinese Characters) and Taiwan (Traditional Chinese Characters) students in 2000. Large print and braille versions are also available.

In 2004, the competition was expanded to allow two more divisions, one for year five and six students, and another for year three and four students.

In 2005, students from 38 different countries entered the competition.

Format
The competition paper consists of twenty-five multiple-choice questions and five integer questions, which are ordered in increasing difficulty. Students record their personal details and mark their answers by pencil on a carbon-mark answer sheet, which is marked by computer in the Australian Maths Trust offices. Since 2016, an online option has been available to schools. The online competition has the same content as the paper version and results from both options are assessed together, with options being jumbled between computers (to hinder attempts on cheating). However, the paper is undertaken on a browser with a onetime pin with focus monitors (accessible by the AMT and supervisors). There are five divisions in total: Senior (for years 11 and 12), Intermediate (for years 9 and 10), Junior (for years 7 and 8), Upper Primary (for years 5 and 6) and Middle Primary (for years 3 and 4). 

Students are allowed 75 minutes (60 minutes for the two primary papers) to read and answer the questions. Calculators are not permitted for secondary-level entrants, but geometrical aids such as rulers, compasses, protractors and paper for working are permitted. Primary-level entrants may use calculators and any aids normally found in a classroom.

The original points scheme, which was in operation from inception until 2001, consisted of three groups of ten questions. The first ten questions were worth three marks each, the next ten four marks each, and the last ten five marks each. Students were deducted a quarter of the marks for a given question if they answered incorrectly, so that a student randomly guessing the answers would gain no numerical benefit (on statistical average). Students started with 30 marks, so that a student who answered all questions incorrectly would record a total score of zero, while one who answered all questions correctly would record a score of 150.

In 2002, the format was changed so that no penalties were incurred for incorrect answers to the first twenty questions, and for each of the last ten questions, a correct answer gave eight marks, no answer gave three marks, and no marks were given for an incorrect answer; the total score remained the same at 150.

In 2005, the format was changed once more.  This time the first ten questions are still worth three marks each and the next ten are still worth four marks each, however the last ten are now once again worth 5 marks each.  To make it harder to guess the most difficult questions, the last 5 questions required integer answers between 0 and 999 inclusive.  The total score possible was thus reduced to 120. 

It has since been changed yet again. The first 25 questions have remained with the same mark allocation, however the last 5 questions have been altered. Although still requiring integer answers between 0 and 999, the mark allocation has been changed to 6 marks for Q26, 7 marks for Q27, 8 marks for Q28, 9 marks for Q29 and 10 marks for Q30, bringing the total marks to 135.

The competition is supervised by staff of the individual educational institutions, and the Australian Maths Trust reserves the right to conduct re-examinations in order to preserve the integrity of the competition, if it believes that students have not attempted the paper under sufficiently stringent conditions.

Syllabus 
There is no official declared syllabus which determines the scope of the problems presented to the students. However, all problems can be solved without the use of calculus.

Awards system
Despite the name of the competition, students are allocated awards for their performance relative to other students in their region, of the same year level. For Australian students, this means their State or Territory, and for other students, their country. Although the personal data such as date of birth and gender are collected, this is not used in the percentile ranking, which is only determined by the raw score. The award scheme is as such
 Prize – Students above the 99.7 percentile
 High Distinction – Students between the 97 and 99.7 percentile (Between 95 and 99.7 percentile for senior division)
 Distinction -Students between the 80 and 97 percentile (Between 75 and 95 percentile for senior division)
 Credit – Students between the 45 and 80 percentile (Between 40 and 75 percentile for senior division)
 Proficiency – Students below the 45 percentile who have a satisfactory score (at least 32 but may sometimes be lower) 
 Participation – Students who have not received a higher award

Students who have won a prize may also receive a medal if they are determined to have performed outstandingly well with respect to their region and the competition as a whole. All students receive a certificate, and prizewinners are awarded an additional monetary sum or book voucher. Students who achieve the maximum score are awarded the BH Neumann certificate. From 2008, this award has been renamed the Peter O'Halloran Certificate in honour of the foundation executive director of the Trust. In 1998, a record 10 students in Australia, and 23 in Singapore achieved the maximum attainable score. A re-examination was carried out in order to determine the Singaporean medallists. 

All students receive an analysis sheet along with their certificate, which records their answers for each question, along with the correct answers. The questions are divided into four categories: arithmetic, algebra, geometry and problem solving, and the number of questions that the student answered correctly for each category is listed along with the regional mean.

Every school receives a more comprehensive analysis, with a complete record of answers given by all students, as well as the percentage of students choosing any given answer for a given question, and a comparison to the percentage of students choosing any given answer for a given question in the whole region. Schools also receive analysis of their students by mathematical topic, compared to the entire region.

Successful students 
At least three students have won medals on all six of their opportunities to participate:
 Geoffrey Chu, Scotch College, Melbourne, Victoria (1995–2000)
 Peter McNamara, Hale School, Western Australia (1996–2001)
 Aaron Chong, Doncaster Secondary College, Victoria (2005–2010)

Shane Booth, Wanganui Park High School, Shepparton, Victoria was the first to win five consecutive medals (1981–1985).

Ivan Guo, Sydney Boys High School, New South Wales was the first person to win three consecutive BH Neumann certificates, which are only awarded to those who achieve a perfect score.

References
 An AMC fact sheet from the Australian Mathematics Trust

External links
Australian Mathematics Trust website
History of Australian Mathematics Competition, written by Emeritus Professor Peter Taylor (Former Executive Director of AMT)

Mathematics competitions
Education competitions in Australia
Recurring events established in 1976